

Coaches
As of 17 March 2022

''*Denotes draws includes knockout matches decided on penalty shootouts.

References 

Futsal in Iran